Kamianske River Port (formerly called Dniprodzerzhynsk) is located on the right bank of the Dnieper River in Kamianske, Dnipropetrovsk Oblast, Ukraine. The port was founded in 1878 as a pier used for passenger service, transportation of agricultural products, granite, sand, and metal. The largest transshipment volumes of the modern port are about 1.5 million tons of cargo per year.

The port is located 475 km from the mouth of the Dnieper.

The duration of navigation is from March 20 to November 28.

There are three cargo berths.

Interesting fact
The port is in a former Soviet closed city Kamianske (Dniprodzerzhinsk) that was home to the largest uranium processing factory in the former Soviet Union.

See also
Kamianske
Cargo turnover of Ukrainian ports

References

River ports of Ukraine
Transport in Ukraine by city